The Great Love is a 1918 American silent war drama film directed and written by D. W. Griffith who, along with scenario writer Stanner E.V. Taylor, is credited as "Captain Victor Marier". The film stars George Fawcett and Lillian Gish. Set during World War I, exterior scenes were shot on location in England. The Great Love is now considered to be a lost film.

This film had footage of several high society and influential British people helping out with the war effort, including  Queen Alexandra, the widow of King Edward VII, and Sir Frederick Treves, the doctor who once knew and tended to Joseph Merrick a.k.a. "The Elephant Man". Footage of a Zeppelin air raid on London taken by G. W. Bitzer was also included the film.

Plot
As described in a film magazine, Jim Young (Harron) of Youngstown, Pennsylvania, reads of the German war atrocities and decides to enlist in the British army, thus becoming a forerunner of the American forces that are subsequently to leave for the battlefields of Europe. He begins active training at a camp outside London. While enjoying a few hours of leave, he meets Susie Broadplains (Gish), a young woman from Australia. She is flattered by his attentions and their friendship soon blossoms into love. Susie's one dissipation consists of walking in Pump Lane with her soldier boy. She falls heir to 20,000 pounds and at once becomes the object of much solicitude from Sir Roger Brighton (Walthall), a fortune hunter. When Jim is ordered with his regiment to go to the Front, he has no time to bid her adieu. Sir Rogers seeks to force his marriage before he leaves for Paris on a business trip, and she accepts him. German plotters plan to destroy an arsenal at night and Sir Roger is inveigled into driving an automobile along a London road with its lights turned skyward to guide the Zeppelins. Jim, wounded and home on furlough, detects Sir Roger on the lonely road, follows and traps him in his cottage. Sir Roger turns his pistol on himself rather than be taken alive. Susie finds the "great love" in service for the cause of democracy and her country, with a greater love in sight.

Cast
 George Fawcett as The Rev. Josephus Broadplains
 Lillian Gish as Susie Broadplains
 Robert Harron as Jim Young
 Gloria Hope as Jessie Lovewell
 George Siegmann as Mr. Seymour
 Maxfield Stanley as John Broadplains
 Rosemary Theby as Miss Corintee
 Henry B. Walthall as Sir Roger Brighton

VIPs appearing as themselves
Elizabeth Asquith
Lily Elsie
Violet Keppel
Hazel, Lady Lavery *as Mrs. John Lavery
Lady Diana Manners
Countess of Masserne
Alice Heine, Princess of Monaco
Honourable Mrs. Montague
Lady Paget (*unclear if this is Walburga or her son Victor's actress wife Olive May, also called Lady Paget)
Queen Alexandra
Henry Charles Stanley (*incorrectly posted as Sir Henry Morton Stanley, the famous explorer who had died in 1904)
Bettina Stuart-Wortley
Sir Frederick Treves
Duchess of Beaufort
Kathleen Pelham Burn, Countess of Drogheda]] (1887-1966)

Reception
Like many American films of the time, The Great Love was subject to restrictions and cuts by city and state film censorship boards. For example, the Chicago Board of Censors required cuts, in Reel 4, three scenes of mother with illegitimate child with wife of Baron, Reel 5, after the intertitle "You are my wife and I stay here tonight" eliminate all following scenes of man pounding bed, and, Reel 6, the intertitle "Drunk with two wines — champagne and passion".

See also
List of lost films

References

External links

 
 

1918 films
1918 lost films
1918 drama films
1910s war drama films
American war drama films
American silent feature films
American black-and-white films
Famous Players-Lasky films
Films directed by D. W. Griffith
Films shot in England
Films with screenplays by Stanner E.V. Taylor
Films with screenplays by D. W. Griffith
Lost American films
Lost war drama films
Paramount Pictures films
American World War I films
1910s American films
Silent American drama films
Silent war drama films
1910s English-language films
English-language drama films